The Tree Council was founded in 1974 in the United Kingdom, and became a registered charity in 1978. Its primary objective is to act as an umbrella organisation for local groups involved in the planting, care and conservation of trees throughout the United Kingdom, and followed the successful government-sponsored Plant A Tree In '73 campaign.

The charity is based at Canada Water, Surrey Quays, London. Its initiatives include:
 In 2002, selecting 50 Great British Trees to honour the Queen's Golden Jubilee of accession to the throne
 Supporting the UK government's Big Tree Plant campaign, which planted one million trees between 2011 and 2015
 Supporting the 2017 Charter for Trees, Woods and People
 Supporting the Queen's Green Canopy to mark her Platinum Jubilee in 2022
 Organising National Tree Week in November each year


Notable people 
Landscape architect and garden designer Sylvia Crow was the organisation's chairman between 1974 and 1976.

See also 
 The Tree Register

References

External links
 

Environmental organisations based in the United Kingdom
Trees of the United Kingdom
Environmental organizations established in 1974
1974 establishments in the United Kingdom
Environmental charities based in the United Kingdom